Rhynchospora is a diverse plant genus of sedges with approximately 400 currently accepted taxa.

This is an alphabetical list of the Rhynchospora species.

A

B

C

D

E

F

G

H

I

J

K

L

M

N

O

P

Q

R

S

T

U

V

W

X

Y

Z

References

External links

Lists
Rhynchospora